Ghai is a surname that is found among the Khatri community of India. They are a part of Khukhrain sub-caste among the Khatris which also includes the clans of Anand, Bhasin, Chadha, Kohli, Ghai, Sahni (Sawhney), Sethi and Suri.

Kamal Shankar Srivastava writes that all Khukrains including Ghais were originally found near the banks of Indus and Jhelum river especially in the towns of Pind Dadan Khan, Peshawar and Nowshera.

Notable people 
 Kiran Ghai (born 1949), Indian national vice president of the Bharatiya Janata Party
 Rajinder Ghai (born 1960), Indian cricketer
 Shivani Ghai (born 1975), British Indian actress
 Subhash Ghai (born 1945), Indian film maker
 Ved Kumari Ghai (born 1931), Indian Sanskrit scholar
 Yash Ghai (born 1938), Fellow of the British Academy

References

Surnames
Surnames of Indian origin
Indian surnames
Punjabi-language surnames
Hindu surnames
Khatri clans
Khatri surnames